Manorama Devi is a leader of the Janata Dal (United) and a member of the Bihar Legislative Council from Jehanabad & Arwal. She is currently a member from 2015-Incumbent . She was arrested by the Police in May 2016 for an alleged crime.

Personal life
Her husband Bindeshwari Prasad Yadav died on 23 July 2020 due to heart attack in AIIMS at Patna.

References

Janata Dal (United) politicians
Crime in Bihar
Living people
Indian prisoners and detainees
Year of birth missing (living people)
Members of the Bihar Legislative Council
People from Gaya district
20th-century Indian women politicians